The India national cricket team toured Australia in the 1977–78 season to play 5 Test matches. Australia won the test series 3-2. The matches were played at the same time as the first World Series Cricket matches.

Test series

1st Test

2nd Test

3rd Test

4th Test

5th Test

Annual reviews
 Playfair Cricket Annual 1978
 Wisden Cricketers' Almanack 1978

Further reading
 Chris Harte, A History of Australian Cricket, Andre Deutsch, 1993
 Ramachandra Guha, A Corner of a Foreign Field - An Indian History of a British Sport, Picador, 2001

References

External sources
 India in Australia, 1977/78 at ESPNcricinfo archive
 

1977 in Australian cricket
1977 in Indian cricket
1977–78 Australian cricket season
1978 in Australian cricket
1978 in Indian cricket
1977-78
International cricket competitions from 1975–76 to 1980